Valentina Yakovleva (born 18 January 1947) is a Soviet swimmer. She competed at the 1964 Summer Olympics in the 100 m butterfly event, but did not reach the final. Between 1963 and 1965 she won two national titles and set seven national records in butterfly and medley disciplines.

After marriage she changed her last name to Rakaeva. She works as a swimming coach at a Moscow sports school; she is also a swimming referee.

References

1947 births
Living people
Soviet female butterfly swimmers
Swimmers at the 1964 Summer Olympics
Ukrainian female butterfly swimmers
Olympic swimmers of the Soviet Union
Sportspeople from Lviv